NOW.com (Network of the World) was an online TV/broadband network operated by PCCW Limited.

Service
The network broadcast news and other programmes in primarily in English, Cantonese, Mandarin, as well as select channels in other languages:

 German
 Hindi
 Italian
 Japanese
 Korean
 Portuguese
 Russian
 Spanish

Channels offered include:

 Business - now Business news
 Entertainment - Star World, BBC Prime
 Music - MTV Southeast Asia Channel V
 Indian - STAR Plus
 Movies - HBO, MGM, Cinemax, Star Movies
 Infotainment - Discovery, Animal Planet, CCTV4, CCTV9
 News - CNN International, BBC, Bloomberg News, * Sports - Golf Channel, ESPN

TV Channel

History
NOW was formed by Hong Kong's Richard Li in Hong Kong in 2003. It offers  broadband entertainment portal and pay-per channel television service.

External links
 NOW.com Broadband TV
 NOW.com - Wireless Broadband UK
 NOW.com Hong Kong

Television stations in Hong Kong
Television websites